La Haye-de-Calleville (literally La Haye of Calleville) is a commune in the Eure department in northern France.

Population

See also
Communes of the Eure department

References

Communes of Eure